Nonnus is a genus of parasitic wasps in the family Ichneumonidae. It is the type and only genus of the tribe Nonnini and the subfamily Nonninae.

Species include:
Nonnus antennatus Cresson, 1874
Nonnus atratus Cresson, 1874
Nonnus bicolor (Schmiedeknecht, 1908)
Nonnus brethesi Townes, 1966
Nonnus hastulatus (Brues & Richardson, 1913)
Nonnus nigrans (Brues & Richardson, 1913)
Nonnus punctulatus (Szepligeti, 1916)
Nonnus rufithorax (Szepligeti, 1916)
Nonnus rufus (Schmiedeknecht, 1908)
Nonnus tornator (Fabricius, 1804)

References

Ichneumonidae
Ichneumonidae genera